The Kilgore Rangers were a minor league baseball team that played in the East Texas League from 1937 to 1938. It was based in Kilgore, Texas and replaced the Kilgore Braves. 

Pitcher Eddie Lopat, who won 166 games in a 12-year major league career, and Dave Short, who played in the major leagues briefly in the early 1940s, played for the team in 1938.

References

Defunct minor league baseball teams
Defunct baseball teams in Texas
Baseball teams established in 1937
Baseball teams disestablished in 1938
1937 establishments in Texas
1938 disestablishments in Texas
Gregg County, Texas
Rusk County, Texas
East Texas League teams